Nyctemera latemarginata is a moth of the family Erebidae first described by Arnold Pagenstecher in 1901. It is found in New Guinea.

References

Nyctemerina
Moths described in 1901